This is a list of paintings by the British Pre-Raphaelite artist Ford Madox Brown.

1830s and 1840s

1850s

1860s

1870s

1880s

The Manchester Murals (1879–1893)
The Manchester Murals is a series of twelve paintings in Manchester Town Hall covering the history of Manchester :
The Romans Building a Fort at Mancenion
The Baptism of Edwin
The Expulsion of the Danes from Manchester
The Establishment of the Flemish Weavers 
The Trial of Wycliffe
The Proclamation Regarding Weights and Measures 
Crabtree Observing the Transit of Venus
Chetham's Life Dream
Bradshaw's Defence of Manchester
John Kay, Inventor of the Fly Shuttle
The Opening of the Bridgewater Canal
Dalton collecting Marsh-Fire Gas

Brown